Glenn is an unincorporated community in Kinkaid Township, Jackson County, Illinois, United States. Glenn was named after either its first postmaster, Walter J. Glenn, or early settler Robin Glenn.

References

Unincorporated communities in Jackson County, Illinois
Unincorporated communities in Illinois